Coppens is a Dutch patronymic surname primarily found in East Flanders. It may refer to:

 Amaya Coppens (born 1994), Nicaraguan student activist
 An Coppens (born 1971), Belgian gamification expert
 Astrid Coppens (born 1983), Belgian model and actress
 Augustin Coppens (1668–1740), Flemish painter and engraver
 Claude Coppens (born 1936), Belgian pianist and composer
 Christophe Coppens (born 1969), Belgian fashion designer and artist
 Els Coppens-van de Rijt (born 1943), Dutch artist and authorcommentator
 Henri Coppens (1930–2015), Belgian footballer
 Jo Coppens (born 1990), Belgian footballer
 Matt Coppens (born 1971), American ice sledge hockey player
 Omer Coppens, Belgian painter and ceramic artist 
 Paul Coppens, Belgian television writer and sound engineer
 Philip Coppens (chemist) (born 1930), Dutch chemist and crystallographer
 Philip Coppens (author) (1971–2012), Belgian author and radio host 
 Thierry Coppens (born 1979), Belgian footballer
 Willy Coppens (1892–1986), Belgium's leading fighter ace of World War I
 Yves Coppens (born 1934), French anthropologist

See also
 Coppen (disambiguation)
 172850 Coppens, an asteroid named after Yves Coppens

Dutch-language surnames
Patronymic surnames